Carlos Eduardo Rodríguez Gutiérrez (born 27 July 2000) is a Venezuelan football player who plays as midfielder for Atlético Venezuela in Venezuelan Primera División.

References

2000 births
Living people
Venezuelan footballers
Venezuelan Primera División players
Atlético Venezuela C.F. players
Association football midfielders
People from Maturín
21st-century Venezuelan people